Sutrina is a genus of flowering plants from the orchid family, Orchidaceae. The genus contains only two known species, both endemic to South America.

Sutrina bicolor Lindl. - Peru
Sutrina garayi Senghas - Bolivia

See also 
 List of Orchidaceae genera

References

External links 

Orchids of South America
Oncidiinae genera
Oncidiinae